The Slave River is a Canadian river that flows from the confluence of the Rivière des Rochers and Peace River in northeastern Alberta and empties into Great Slave Lake in the Northwest Territories. The river's name is thought to derive from the name for the Slavey group of the Dene First Nations, Deh Gah Got'ine, in the Athabaskan language. The Chipewyan had displaced other native people from this region.

Rapids and kayaking

The Slave River and the rapids around Fort Smith are some of the best whitewater kayaking in the world. There are four sets of rapids: Pelican, Rapids of the Drowned, Mountain Portage, and Cassette. The rapids range from easy class I on the International Scale of River Difficulty to unrunnable killer class VI holes. Huge volume, massive waves, and the home of the northernmost river pelican colony in North America characterize this river. The pelicans nest on many of the islands at the Mountain Portage Rapids. These islands serve as a sanctuary to the birds and are closed to human traffic from April 15 to September 15.

Boaters have been killed in the Slave River rapids. The earliest recorded fatalities occurred as a part of Cuthbert Grant's expedition of 1786 at the Rapids of the Drowned (a class II-IV Rapid Set).

Course
The Slave River originates in the Peace-Athabasca Delta, at the forks of Peace River and Rivière des Rochers, which drains the Athabasca River and Lake Athabasca. The Slave River flows north into the Northwest Territories and into the Great Slave Lake north of Fort Resolution. From there the water reaches the Arctic Ocean through the Mackenzie River.

Portage and navigation
Prior to the extension of railway service to Hay River, Northwest Territories, a river port on Great Slave Lake, cargo shipment on the Slave River was an important transport route. Locally built wooden vessels were navigating the river into the late 19th century.
Tractors were imported from Germany to assist in hauling goods around the rapids.  Tugs and barges of the Northern Transportation Company's "Radium Line" were constructed in the south and disassembled. The parts were then shipped by rail to Waterways, Alberta, shipped by barge to the portage, and portaged to the lower river for reassembly, where they could navigate most of the rest of the extensive Mackenzie River basin.

Tributaries

Peace-Athabasca Delta
Athabasca River
Lake Athabasca
Rivière des Rochers
Chilloneys Creek
Revillon Coupe
Dempsey Creek
Peace River
Scow Channel
Murdock Creek
Darough Creek
Powder Creek
La Butte Creek
Hornaday River
Salt River
Little Buffalo River

See also
List of rivers of Alberta
List of rivers of the Northwest Territories

References

External links

Rivers of Alberta
Rivers of the Northwest Territories